Glidden is a surname. Notable people with the surname include:

Bob Glidden, American drag racer
Carlos Glidden
Francis Harrington Glidden
Freddie Glidden (1927–2019), Scottish footballer
Joseph Glidden, American businessman and farmer
Tommy Glidden, English footballer